= Aquiherbosa =

Plant community of herbaceous plans

Aquiherbosa is a subdivision of the plant community Herbosa and consists of herbaceous plants that exist in abundantly wet areas. This can refer to plant communities in wetlands, ponds, or other bodies of water.

This plant community can be further divided in to the Emersiherbosa which comprise the communities of fens (Flachmroor) sedge swamps, reed swamps (Phragmitalia) and salt marshes; the Submnersiherbosa or submerged aquatic communities both fresh and salt water; and the Sphagniherbosa (Hochmoor) or communities characterized by the presence and abundance of Sphagnum spp., by acid substrata and the formation of peat.

This community classification has been used to describe types of formation classes for aquatic vegetation such as Aquiherbosa natantis (Vegetation with floating leaves), Aquiherbosa Submersi (Submerged Vegetation), and Aquiherbosa amphibiae (Aero-aquatic Vegetation).
